Kazem Sami (1935 – 23 November 1988) was Iran's minister of health in the transitional government of Mehdi Bazargan and leader of The Liberation Movement of People of Iran (JAMA).

Political career
Kazem Sami was one of the leaders and organizers of the Iranian revolution. He served as the minister of health in the Iran's interim government, making him Iran's first minister of health after the Iranian Revolution of 1979. He ran in the first Iranian presidential elections, but lost to Abolhassan Banisadr, coming sixth out of the seven presidential candidates. He served as a deputy in the first post-revolutionary Iranian Parliament. After distancing himself from the revolutionary government, Dr Sami remained one of the few active opposition leaders in Iran, openly criticizing the Islamic Republic government. He also wrote a famous open letter to Ayatollah Khomeini, criticizing him for the continuation of the Iran-Iraq war after Iran had recovered her occupied territories, notably the liberation of Khorramshahr.

Murder
Sami was murdered in his private medical clinic in 1988, under suspicious circumstances. He is believed to be one of the first victims of the "chain murders", a series of murders and disappearances of Iranian dissident intellectuals in the 1990s.

See also
List of unsolved murders

References

1988 deaths
1935 births
20th-century Iranian physicians
Candidates in the 1980 Iranian presidential election
Government ministers of Iran
Iranian murder victims
Iranian psychiatrists
JAMA (political party) politicians
Male murder victims
Members of the Iranian Committee for the Defense of Freedom and Human Rights
National Front (Iran) student activists
Party of the Iranian People politicians
People murdered in Iran
Unsolved murders in Iran
Muslim socialists